Nurettin Canikli (born 15 May 1960) is a Turkish politician, the former Minister of National Defense of Turkey and a Member of Parliament for Giresun under the ruling Justice and Development Party. He previously also served as the Deputy Prime Minister of Turkey and the Minister of Customs and Trade of Turkey.

Early life and career
After finishing the İmam Hatip school in Giresun, Canikli studied Economics at Ankara University graduating with a Bachelors's degree. Canikli obtained a Master's degree in Finance from University of Sheffield in the United Kingdom.

Canikli worked in various positions in the Ministry of Finance. and also worked as a columnist on a daily basis at the Turkish daily newspaper Yeni Şafak between 1997 and 2002.

Justice and Development Party
Canikli is a member of the founders’ council of the Justice and Development Party and was elected as Member of Parliament for the Giresun province at the Turkish general election on 3 November 2002. He served as the MP of Giresun province during the 22nd, 23rd and 24th terms. In the 2007 and 2011 elections, he secured his seat in the Grand National Assembly of Turkey (TBMM). On August 29, 2014, he was appointed Minister of Customs and Trade in the Cabinet of Ahmet Davutoğlu.

Personal life
Canikli is married and father of four children. He also speaks English.

References

1960 births
People from Alucra
Imam Hatip school alumni
Ankara University Faculty of Political Sciences alumni
Alumni of the University of Sheffield
Turkish civil servants
Yeni Şafak people
Justice and Development Party (Turkey) politicians
Deputies of Giresun
Ministers of Customs and Trade of Turkey
Living people
Members of the 26th Parliament of Turkey
Members of the 24th Parliament of Turkey
Members of the 23rd Parliament of Turkey
Members of the 22nd Parliament of Turkey
Members of the 65th government of Turkey
Ministers of National Defence of Turkey